Fiona Boyce (born 11 June 1987, Perth) is an Australian field hockey player.  Her uncle, Grant Boyce, was also an Olympic hockey player.

References

External links
 

1987 births
Living people
Australian female field hockey players
Field hockey players at the 2012 Summer Olympics
Olympic field hockey players of Australia
Commonwealth Games medallists in field hockey
Commonwealth Games gold medallists for Australia
Field hockey players from Perth, Western Australia
Field hockey players at the 2010 Commonwealth Games
21st-century Australian women
Medallists at the 2010 Commonwealth Games